Ewan McQuillin (born 12 November 1991) is a Scottish rugby union player. He previously played for Glasgow Warriors, Southern Knights, Yorkshire Carnegie, London Scottish and Edinburgh at the tighthead prop position.

Rugby Union career

Amateur career

McQuillin started with Gala.

McQuillin then moved to Melrose.

McQuillin played for Blackheath in January 2018.

Professional career

McQuillin was a Scottish Rugby Academy player with Edinburgh Rugby.

McQuillin played for London Scottish.

McQuillin has also played for Yorkshire Carnegie.

McQuillin played for Super 6 side the Southern Knights in the 2019-20 season.

On 10 February 2020 it was announced that McQuillin had signed for Glasgow Warriors on a short term deal. He made his debut for the club on the 22 February 2020 when the Warriors hosted the Dragons in the Pro14. Glasgow won the match 34-19. He has the Glasgow Warrior No. 310.

He was released by Glasgow Warriors at the end of the 2021-22 season.

References 

1991 births
Living people
Scottish rugby union players
Rugby union props
Glasgow Warriors players
Leeds Tykes players
Blackheath F.C. players
London Scottish F.C. players
Edinburgh Rugby players
Melrose RFC players
Gala RFC players
Rugby union players from Melrose, Scottish Borders